Minhag Polin/Minhag Lita (Polish/Lithuanian/Prague rite) is the Ashkenazi minhag of the Polish Jews, the Polish/Lithuanian or Eastern branch of Nusach Ashkenaz, used in Eastern Europe, the United States and by some Israeli Ashkenazim, particularly those who identify as "Lithuanian". This is different from German or Western branch of Nusach Ashkenaz, known in Hebrew as "Minhag Ashkenaz", used in Western and Central Europe. 

Minhag Polin has historically been the most common minhag among Ashkenazim in Poland, eastern Germany, the Czech lands, Slovakia, Austria, Hungary, Belarus, Latvia, Lithuania, Romania, and Russia, and was introduced to the Moravian town of Kojetín (present day Czech Republic) in 1648. Currently, there are a number of minor differences between the Israeli and American Ashkenazi practice, in that the Israeli practice follows some practices of the Vilna Gaon and certain practices which they adopted from Sephardim.

Minhag Ashkenaz and Minhag Polin 

The term "Minhag Ashkenaz", strictly applied, refers only to the minhag of German Jews south and west of the Elbe, most notably the community of Frankfurt am Main.  North-Eastern German communities such as Hamburg regarded themselves as following Minhag Polin, though their musical tradition and pronunciation of Hebrew, and some of the traditions about the prayers included, were more reminiscent of the western communities than of Poland proper. Jews in Germany were historically divided into the "Bayers" of Bavaria and southern Germany, who followed the Minhag Ashkenaz, and the "Polanders" in northern Germany who followed Minhag Polin.

History 

Due to the large diaspora of Polish and Eastern European Jews who left Europe for the Americas, Israel, and elsewhere, Minhag Polin is the most common minhag found among Jews worldwide. Minhag Polin derives from Minhag Estraich, an earlier Ashkenazi rite developed by Jews in the Austria. When Ashkenazi Jews from the Rhineland began to migrate to Poland and Eastern Europe in the sixteenth and seventeenth centuries, they brought the Minhag Rinus with them. Over time, as Jews moved further east, this minhag became known as Minhag Polin. After the appearance of Hasidic Judaism in the 18th century and the popularization of Kabbalah in Eastern Europe, the Minhag Polin evolved further to incorporate kabbalistic elements.

See also
History of the Jews in Germany
History of the Jews in Poland
Lithuanian Jews
Minhag

References

Ashkenazi Jewish culture in Austria
Ashkenazi Jewish culture in Belarus
Ashkenazi Jewish culture in the Czech Republic
Ashkenazi Jewish culture in Hungary
Ashkenazi Jewish culture in Germany
Ashkenazi Jewish culture in Latvia
Ashkenazi Jewish culture in Lithuania
Ashkenazi Jewish culture in Poland
Ashkenazi Jewish culture in Romania
Ashkenazi Jewish culture in Russia
Ashkenazi Jewish culture in Ukraine
Jews and Judaism in Moldova
Jews and Judaism in Slovakia
Judaism in Austria
Judaism in Belarus
Judaism in Hungary
Judaism in the Czech Republic
Judaism in Germany
Judaism in Latvia
Judaism in Lithuania
Judaism in Poland
Judaism in Romania
Judaism in Russia
Judaism in Ukraine
Minhagim